Michael Maul (born 1978) is a German musicologist noted for his work on Johann Sebastian Bach. Maul was born in Leipzig, and is still based in the city, although his work at the Bach Archive has involved travel to archives and libraries across Germany in search of new sources relating to Bach. He is also artistic director of Leipzig's annual Bach festival.

Education
Maul was awarded a PhD by the University of Freiburg for a dissertation on Baroque opera. It formed the basis of his book Barockoper in Leipzig (1693-1720).

Bach discoveries
Maul's work  attracted international attention with a discovery he made in 2005 in Weimar's Duchess Anna Amalia Library.  This was a hitherto overlooked manuscript containing Alles mit Gott und nichts ohn' ihn, BWV 1127, the first previously unknown vocal work by Bach to be found in 70 years. 

Further research in Weimar identified other previously unknown manuscripts in Bach's hand, this time of music by other composers, throwing light on his musical education.

References

Bach scholars
University of Freiburg alumni
Academic staff of Leipzig University
1978 births
Living people
Writers from Leipzig
21st-century conductors (music)